Pushmataha (c. 1760s–1824) was one of the three regional chiefs of the major divisions of the Choctaw in the 19th century.

Pushmataha may also refer to:

Places in the U.S.
Pushmataha, Alabama
Pushmataha County, Oklahoma
Pushmataha County, Sequoyah
Pushmataha District, an administrative region of the former Choctaw Nations in Indian Territory
Pushmataha Wildlife Management Area

Ships
Pushmataha (sloop), a merchant ship active during the American Civil War
Pushmataha (YTB-830), a United States Navy Natick-class large harbor tug

Other uses
Pushmataha Area Council, a Boy Scout organization in Mississippi, U.S.